The fourth season of High School Rapper (Hangul: 고등래퍼4), a 2021 South Korean survival hip hop TV show. On October 28, 2020, Mnet revealed a short teaser video for the fourth season of the survival show. It aired on Mnet every Friday at 11PM (KST) starting February 19. It was hosted by Nucksal.

Season overview

Mentor teams 
Simon Dominic X Loco, The Quiett X Yumdda, Jay Park X Woogie X pH-1, Changmo X Way Ched.

Episodes

Ep. 1-2: Roll Call: Solo Performance 

No eliminations were held this round.

 Indicates student performance not shown.

¤ Student Kang Hyun (Tendo) is not shown throughout this episode due to a scandal involving sexual assault

Ep. 2-3: Grade Cypher: solo performance 
Groups of 4 or 5 were created in each grade level and 2 rappers were eliminated each round. The groups with the highest combined scores from the Previous round were able to pick their opponents for the round and beats cypher. 

 Eliminated from the show

¤ Student Kang Hyun (Tendo) is not shown throughout this episode due to a scandal involving sexual assault

Ep. 3-4: Group Evaluation 
The 8 honour students from the previous round were made group captains, the captains choose their beat along with any students they wanted to be a part of their group.

Out of the 8 teams, the 4 teams with the highest score would be safe from eliminations however, the bottom 4 teams had 2 members were eliminated. 

 Indicates the top 4 teams, with all group members advancing to the next round.

 Indicates bottom four teams, with two members of their team being eliminated.

 Indicates the eliminated student.

¤ Student Kang Hyun (Tendo) is not shown throughout this episode due to a scandal involving sexual assault

Ep. 4-5: 1:1 Theme Battle 
Students picked their topic through a random card drawing. Whenever two students picked the same theme card they were placed to battle against each other

 Indicates the eliminated student.

¤ Student Kang Hyun (Tendo) is not shown throughout this episode due to a scandal involving sexual assault

¤ Blue boxes indicate pairings where rematches were required due to a 2:2 tie in votes

Revival Round 
At the end of this round it was revealed that 6 of the eliminated students were picked to perform a verse a cappella. From the 6 chosen only 4 were revived.

 Indicates the student revived.

 Indicates the eliminated student.

Ep. 5 - 6: Mentor Group Selection 
Before group selections each mentor group held 1:1 interviews with the remaining 16 students. The 4 honour students were given the option to choose their mentor group, for the remaining 12 students each mentor team recruited who they wanted and if a student had more than one mentor group that wanted them they were given the freedom to choose.

Ep. 6: Team Battle: Group 
For the group mission, the team members made a song using the beat prepared by the mentors. The mentors randomly selected their groups opponent and one student from the losing team was eliminated. 

The guest judges included Verbal Jint, Swings, Zion T., Paloalto, Deepflow, Hangzoo, Boi B

 Eliminated from the show

 Winning Team

 Losing Team 

In February 2021 while the show was still being recorded, Pluma shared to his close friends list on Instagram that he was going to be on a song with Jay Park which one of his friends screenshotted and posted to on online forum, revealing that Min-jae was on Jay Park's team. After the episode was broadcast, Pluma received various hate messages and threats on his Instagram account, which led him to disable his comments.

Ep. 7-8: Team Battle: Textbook Rap Battle 
Unlike the previous seasons, students had to choose a topic from any textbook and write a song about it.

There were two rounds of voting and for groups that lost, only one of them were allowed to pass and the other one disqualified.

This episode had 20 guest judges including Donutman, Khakii, Munchman, Layone, Basick, Zizo, Hanhae, Kebee, Viceversa, Choi LB, Ja Mezz, skyminhyuk, Black Nine, Heo Seong-hyun, MckDaddy, Bryn, Dbo, Ahn Byung-woong, Qwala & O'domar. 

 Eliminated from the show

 Winning Group

 Losing Group

Ep. 8-9: Semi Finals 
The special audience for this episode included 16 rappers: untell, Vinxen, Yenjamin, Young Kay, Rohann, unofficialboyy, Chin Chilla, BlueWhale, Lee Dong-min, Cloudybay, Pullik, Hotchkiss, GI$T, Ellick, Goi & Johny Kwony

 Eliminated from the show

 Finalist

Ep. 10: Finals

Track listing

Ratings

References

External links 

 (Korean) Official website 

2021 South Korean television seasons
Korean-language television shows
South Korean music television shows
Music competitions in South Korea
Mnet (TV channel) original programming
Rapping
Hip hop television